Caribojosia is a monotypic moth genus in the family Notodontidae. Its only species, Caribojosia youngi, is found in the Dominican Republic and adjacent Haiti. Both the genus and species were first described by John E. Rawlins and James S. Miller in 2008.

The larvae feed on mature leaves of Passiflora sexflora.

External links
Species page at Tree of Life project
Dioptine Moths of the Caribbean Region: Description of Two New Genera with Notes on Biology and Biogeography (Lepidoptera: Notodontidae: Dioptinae)

Notodontidae
Monotypic moth genera